Dan Garret or Dan Garrett is a fictional superhero, appearing in American comic books published by multiple companies, including Fox Comics, Charlton Comics, and DC Comics. Garret was created by Charles Nicholas Wojtkoski, and made his first appearance in Fox's Mystery Men Comics #1 during the Golden Age of Comic Books. Garrett is the first character to become the superhero Blue Beetle, predating Ted Kord and Jaime Reyes.

Publication history
The character first appeared by Fox Comics in August 1939 issue of Mystery Men Comics with art by Charles Nicholas Wojtkoski (as Charles Nicholas), though the Grand Comics Database tentatively credits Will Eisner as the scripter. Blue Beetle has starred in a comic book series, comic strip and radio serial, but like most Golden Age of Comic Books superheroes, fell into obscurity in the 1950s. The comic book series saw a number of anomalies in publication: 19 issues, #12 through #30, were published through Holyoke Publishing; no issue #43 was published; publication frequency varied throughout the run; and there were gaps where issues were not published, with large ones occurring in early 1947 and between mid-1948 and early 1950.

In the mid-1950s, Fox Comics went out of business, and despite allegations that they sold Blue Beetle's rights to Charlton Comics, there is no proof that a formal sale took place. Charlton nevertheless published a few sporadic adventures of the Golden Age character before revamping the hero in 1964. Charlton tried three times to use the character to carry a self-titled series. Two of the attempts retained the numbering of a previous title, and were eventually replaced with new titles that carried on the numbering. The new series was short-lived.

Fictional character biography

Golden Age version (Dan Garret)

Dan Garret was a son of a police officer killed by a criminal. This Fox Feature Syndicate version of the character debuted in Mystery Men Comics #1 (August 1939) and continued through issue #31. He began appearing in his own 60-issue series shortly thereafter. Fox Feature Syndicate sponsored a "Blue Beetle Day" at the 1939 New York World's Fair on August 7, 1940, beginning at 10:30 a.m. and including 300 children in relay-race finals at the Field of Special Events, following preliminaries in New York City parks. The race was broadcast over radio station WMCA.

Rookie patrolman Dan Garret originally fought crime as the Blue Beetle without the benefit of superhuman abilities. Garret later donned a bulletproof blue costume (described by Garret as being made of a cellulose material which was "as thin and light as silk but stronger than steel" and temporarily gained superhuman strength and stamina by ingesting the mysterious "Vitamin 2X". Like the Green Hornet, the Blue Beetle would use his signature scarab symbol to bedevil criminals, leaving it to be easily found, hanging it down into a room on a string and even projecting its enlarged image onto a wall with a flashlight.

The supporting cast remained fairly stable throughout this original run and included Joan Mason, a beautiful blond reporter for the Daily Blade who would ultimately star in her own backup stories, and Mike Mannigan, Dan's stereotypical Irish partner on the force who believed despite all evidence to the contrary that the Blue Beetle was a criminal and was always trying to arrest him with little success. Dr. Franz, a local pharmacist and inventor of the bulletproof suit and 2X formula (as well as many other gadgets, including the portable wireless telephone nearly a half-century before they came into common use), played a large role in the early issues but eventually faded from the cast. The Beetle also had a short-lived kid sidekick in the form of Sparkington "Sparky" J. Northrup (Spunky), who originally wore an abbreviated version of the Beetle's costume but later went into action wearing his regular clothes.

During World War II, Garret became a government agent who was often sent overseas on secret missions, but after peace was declared he returned to his former role of neighborhood cop. The Blue Beetle's powers slowly increased over time, eventually giving him the ability to fly and X-ray vision among other bizarre powers that changed from issue to issue at the whim of the writers.  However, when superheroes fell out of vogue in the late 1940s, Fox started to downplay his superhero powers and they were removed. His adventures turned darker, full of sadistic violence and scantily-clad women until he was eventually relegated to hosting true crime stories before the character went on hiatus.

A popular character in his era, the Blue Beetle had his own short-lived comic strip, drawn by a pseudonymous Jack Kirby and others, and a radio serial that ran for 48 thirteen-minute episodes.

Silver Age version (Dan Garrett)

Charlton Comics allegedly obtained the rights to the Blue Beetle (although there is no proof that a formal purchase ever took place) and reprinted some stories in its anthology titles and in a four-issue Blue Beetle reprint series numbered 18–21.

In 1964, during the Silver Age of comics, Charlton revised the character for a new Blue Beetle series. Charlton's new Blue Beetle retained the original's name (adding a second "t"), but no powers or back story, making him a different character. This Beetle was archaeologist Dan Garrett, who obtained a number of superhuman powers (including super strength and vision, flight, and the ability to generate energy blasts) from a mystical scarab he found during a dig in Egypt, where it had been used to imprison an evil mummified Pharaoh. He would transform into the Blue Beetle by saying the words "Kaji Dha!" This version, by writer Joe Gill and artist Tony Tallarico, was played at least initially for camp, with stories like "The Giant Mummy Who Was Not Dead". The Charlton Dan Garrett version of the Blue Beetle ran only until 1966 before his replacement debuted.

AC Comics
Both Blue Beetles reappeared in the third issue of Americomics, a title published by AC Comics in 1983/1984. In the first story in this issue, Ted Kord fought a bogus Dan Garrett, but the second story was more significant. It revealed that the original 1940s Dan was reincarnated as the Silver Age version (minus his memories of his earlier existence) by some unspecified "gods", presumably the ones responsible for his mystic scarab. The gods subsequently resurrected Dan again and sent him off to save Ted Kord's life (leaving him a note saying simply, "Try not to get killed this time"). After this adventure, Kord turned the Blue Beetle name back over to Dan. Americomics was canceled after issue #6, and so far this story has never been referenced by any other publisher.

DC Comics
The Charlton version of Dan Garrett was spotlighted in the second issue of DC's 1980s Secret Origins series, in which his origin was retold along with that of Ted Kord. Subsequent appearances by Dan Garrett (in flashback stories) include guest spots or cameos in Infinity, Inc., Captain Atom, JLA: Year One, and Legends of the DC Universe.

The character briefly returned in DC Comics' first run of Blue Beetle, resurrected by his mystical scarab to battle against his successor. He can also be seen in various flashback stories. His 1940s incarnation is briefly glimpsed in DC's 1993 limited series The Golden Age.

Dynamite Entertainment
In issue #0 of the Project Superpowers miniseries, the Fox Feature Syndicate version of the Blue Beetle appeared in flashbacks (as by now the character/spelling "Dan Garret" was in the public domain). To avoid trademark conflicts with DC Comics, he is referred to in this series by the nickname "Big Blue".

Legacy
It was eventually established that the Charlton Comics incarnation of the Dan Garrett Blue Beetle made his debut on August 14, 1939.

The Jaime Reyes Blue Beetle has met Daniel's granddaughter, Danielle, and has also met Dan himself.

DC Universe
In the pages of "Dark Nights: Death Metal", Dan Garrett was among the deceased superheroes that Batman revived using the Black Lantern ring.

In other media

Television
 Dan Garrett / Blue Beetle makes non-speaking cameo appearances in Batman: The Brave and the Bold.
 Dan Garrett / Blue Beetle makes non-speaking cameo appearances in Young Justice. This version was primarily active in 1939 and is a member of the Justice Society of America who found and bonded with the Blue Beetle scarab after ancient Bialyan mystics severed its connection to the Reach centuries prior.

Film
Dan Garret appears on the cover of a comic book in the Watchmen film tie-in Under the Hood.

Miscellaneous

 Dan Garrett / Blue Beetle appears in a self-titled CBS Radio serial. The Blue Beetle ran from May 15, 1940 to September 13, 1940 and initially starred Frank Lovejoy in the title role. According to Christopher Irving, "Lovejoy brought a maniacal, almost sadistic, cackle to the character. His Blue Beetle seemed as if he took some sick pride in hurting criminals". When Lovejoy left the show after four episodes, he was replaced with a different, uncredited actor.
 Dan Garrett / Blue Beetle appears in a short-lived comic strip, drawn by Jack Kirby, among others, under pseudonyms.

References

External links
 Blue Beetle (Dan Garrett) (archived from the original December 4, 2011) at Don Markstein's Toonopedia.
 Blue Beetle (Dan Garrett) at the International Catalogue of Superheroes
 Blue Beetle (Dan Garrett) 

Fictional characters from Chicago
1939 comics debuts
Comics characters introduced in 1939
Blue Beetle
DC Comics metahumans
DC Comics characters with superhuman strength
Fictional police officers in comics
Fictional archaeologists
Fictional characters with energy-manipulation abilities